Gustav Friedrich Wilhelm Großmann (30 November 1746, Berlin; 20 May 1796, Hanover) was a German actor, writer, and stage director. He wrote the text of the famous operatic Schauspiel mit Gesang Adelheit von Veltheim, with music by Christian Gottlob Neefe (Frankfurt 1780).

In 1778, he became director of the Prince Elector Archbishop of Cologne court theatre in Bonn. In 1784, he set up a theatre company, with which he toured several places in Germany and finally stayed in Hanover.

Further reading 
 
 
 
 
 

1746 births
1796 deaths
German male stage actors
18th-century German male actors
German theatre directors
Male actors from Berlin
People from the Margraviate of Brandenburg
German male writers
18th-century theatre managers